Clay Cane is a journalist, author, political commentator, radio host and filmmaker. He is the director and creator of the documentary Holler If You Hear Me: Black and Gay in the Church, which was nominated for a 2016 GLAAD Media Award. He is the author of Live Through This: Surviving the Intersections of Sexuality, God, and Race, which was released June 2017. Cane is also the host of The Clay Cane Show on SiriusXM Urban View channel 126. He is also the author of The Grift: The Downward Spiral of Black Republicans From the Party of Lincoln to the Cult of Trump, which will be released in 2023.

Career

A graduate from Rutgers University, Phi Beta Kappa, with a BA in English and African-American studies, Cane's commentary has been heard on MTV, ABC, FOX, VH1, CNN, and he frequently appears on MSNBC. 

Cane was the host of Clay Cane Live, a weekly call-in and political radio talk show on WWRL 1600AM, which was home to radio programs for Reverend Al Sharpton and Ed Schultz. After 86 years, the station aired its final broadcast in December 2013. In November 2017, Cane returned to radio on SiriusXM Urban View channel 126 for The Clay Cane Show, which has included a wide range of interviews: Vice President Kamala Harris, Secretary Pete Buttigieg, Dan Rather, Tyler Perry, Georgia Senator Raphael Warnock, Michael Eric Dyson, Reverend Jesse Jackson, Jenifer Lewis, and more. In 2022, the show was honored with the Best Regularly Scheduled Social Justice Program award from the New York Festivals Radio Awards for Cane's Exonerated series. 

He was previously a member of New York Film Critics Online and the Broadcast Television Journalists Association.

Cane is the co-editor and contributing writer of the 2012 anthology For Colored Boys Who Have Considered Suicide When the Rainbow is Still Not Enough: Coming of Age, Coming Out, and Coming Home. He also contributed to Where Did Our Love Go: Love and Relationships in the African-American Community. In 2015, Cane created, directed and produced the BET.com original documentary Holler If You Hear Me: Black and Gay in the Church. Premiering at NYU in November 2015, the film explored homophobia in the black church by tackling the intersections of race, gender, sexuality and religion. The film earned a 2016 GLAAD Media Award nomination for Outstanding Digital Journalism and a Black Reel Award nomination for Best Television Documentary or Special. On February 24, 2016, The White House featured Cane as a Black History Month speaker along with a screening of the documentary. Cane was also presented on a panel discussion, focused on the film, faith, and sexuality in the Black community. 

Cane is the author of Live Through This: Surviving the Intersections of Sexuality, God, and Race. The book was published via Cleis Press in 2017. Publishers Weekly called the book, "Cane’s observations on the intersections of class and race, which do not shy away from the quagmire of being poor in America, resonate in today’s fraught political climate. Even when he addresses painful issues such as domestic violence, sexual exploitation, food insecurity, and inadequate mental health care, he retains humor and compassion."

The Grift: The Downward Spiral of Black Republicans From the Party of Lincoln to the Party of Trump, published by EBONY, will be released in 2023. The book, part history and part cultural analysis, chronicles the complicated history of Black Republicans.

Published works

Live Through This: Surviving the Intersections of Sexuality, God, and Race (Cleis Press, 2017)
For Colored Boys Who Have Considered Suicide When the Rainbow is Still Not Enough: Coming of Age, Coming Out, and Coming Home (Magnus, 2012)
Where Did Our Love Go: Love and Relationships in the African-American Community (Agate Bolden, 2013)

References

External links

Melissa Harris-Perry Interviews Clay Cane About Holler If You Hear Me: Black and Gay in the Church
The Black Church: A Haven and a Hardship for Its LGBT Members (Interview With Clay Cane)
Documentary Explores The Reality Of Being Black And Gay In The Church
Janet Mock & Clay Cane in Conversation on Being Black & LGBT
TheGrio Interviews Clay Cane About New LGBT Radio Show

Year of birth missing (living people)
Living people
Rutgers University alumni
LGBT African Americans
American gay writers
American male essayists
21st-century American essayists
LGBT film directors
African-American film directors
American film directors
African-American film producers
American film producers
African-American journalists
American male journalists
African-American television personalities
American political commentators
American political writers
American social commentators
21st-century American male writers
21st-century African-American writers
21st-century LGBT people